Al-Sinaat Al-Harbiya Sport Club is an Iraqi football club based in Al-Karkh, Baghdad, that plays in Iraq Division Three.

History

Overview
Al-Sinaat Al-Harbiya was founded in 1992 under the name of Al-Qaqaa, and it played in the Iraq FA Cup in the 1998–99 and 2001–02 seasons, and it also played in the preliminary qualifiers for the Iraqi Premier League in the 2000–01 season, and after 2003 the club's activities were suspended. In August 2021, the club's sports activities were restored, and its name was changed to Al-Sinaat Al-Harbiya, and it played in the Iraq Division Three.

Managerial history
 Uday Ghawi
 Basil Baqer 
 Qasim Nahw

See also 
 1998–99 Iraq FA Cup
 2000–01 Iraqi Elite League
 2001–02 Iraq FA Cup

References

External links
 Al-Sinaat Al-Harbiya SC on Goalzz.com
 Iraq Clubs- Foundation Dates

Football clubs in Baghdad
1992 establishments in Iraq